Körfez is a town and district of the Kocaeli Province in the Marmara region of Turkey. Yarımca merged with Tütünçiftlik to become Körfez. It was created from eastern part of Gebze and western part of İzmit (Then called Center) districts in 1987. It has borders with Şile to north, Derince from east, Dilovası from southwest and Gebze from west. Its center was called Yarımca before a district center. Hereke and Kirazlıyalı were towns with municipality until abolition of their municipalities in 2009 and were converted in quarters. The mayor is İsmail Baran (AKP) and the district governor is Hasan Hüseyin Can. The cement plant is a major source of greenhouse gas.

See also
 İzmit Körfez Circuit

References

External links
 District governor's official website 
 District municipality's official website 

Populated places in Kocaeli Province
Districts of Kocaeli Province